Irwin Allan Sealy (born 1951) is an Indian writer. His novel The Everest Hotel: A Calendar was shortlisted for the 1998 Booker prize.

Biography
Allan was born in Allahabad and he went to La Martiniere School in Lucknow and then on to St. Stephen's College, Delhi University. He has worked in Canada, the USA, New Zealand and Australia.

His first novel The Trotter Nama was published in 1988 and tells the story of seven generations of an Anglo-Indian family. 

He now lives in Dehradun, Uttarakhand.

Awards
 Commonwealth Writers' Prize, Best First Book, Europe and South Asia, in 1989
 Sahitya Akademi Award in 1991 
 Crossword Book Award in 1998
 Padma Shri in 2012

List of works
 The Trotter-Nama: A Chronicle, (New York: Knopf, 1988; London: Penguin Books, 1990; New York: Viking Penguin, 1990) .
 Hero: A Fable, (London: Secker and Warburg, 1991, 288pp) .
 From Yukon to Yukatan: a Western Journey, (London: Secker & Warburg, 1994., 323pp) .
 The Everest Hotel: A Calendar, (London: Doubleday, 1998, 331pp) .
 The Brainfever Bird, (London: Picador, 2003, 320pp) .
 Red: An Alphabet (London: Picador, 2006, 343pp) .
 The Small Wild Goose Pagoda: An Almanack (New Delhi: Aleph, 2014, 300pp) .
 Zelaldinus: A Masque (New Delhi: Aleph/Almost Island, 2017, 168pp) .
 Asoca: A Sutra (New Delhi: Penguin Random House, 2021, 392pp) .

References

External links
 
 I Allan Sealy at The South Asian Literary Recordings Project, Library of Congress; New Delhi Office, India

Living people
Anglo-Indian people
Novelists from Uttar Pradesh
Writers from Allahabad
1951 births
La Martinière College, Lucknow alumni
Recipients of the Sahitya Akademi Award in English
Recipients of the Padma Shri in literature & education
20th-century Indian novelists
21st-century Indian novelists